A  is a flat scepter originating from China, where they were originally used as narrow tablets for recording notes and orders. They were historically used by officials throughout East Asia, including Japan, Korea, Ryukyu, and Vietnam. They continue to be used in daoist and shinto ritual contexts in some parts of East Asia.

Origin
From the Jin dynasty onwards, following the increased proliferation of paper, the  became a ceremonial instrument.

The  was originally used at court for the taking of notes and was usually made of bamboo. Officials could record speaking notes on the tablet ahead of the audience, and record the emperor's instructions during the audience. Likewise, the emperor could use one for notes during ceremonies.

The  eventually became a ritual implement; it also became customary for officials to shield their mouths with their  when speaking to the emperor.

A  can be made of different material according to the holder's rank: sovereigns used jade (similar to, but not the same as, the ceremonial jade sceptre, ), nobles used ivory, and court officials used bamboo. 

A  is often seen in portraits of Chinese mandarins, but is now mostly used by daoist priests.

Use in China

The chancellor was provided with a  rack, which was carried into the palace. After an audience, the  could be left on the rack. Lesser officials had  bags, which were held by their attendants. During the early Tang dynasty, Mandarins of the fifth rank or above used ivory , while those below used wooden ones. The rules were further elaborated later to require that mandarins of the third rank or above used  which were curved at the front and straight at the back, while those of the fifth rank or above used  which were curved at the front and angled at the back. The  used by lower rank mandarins were made of bamboo and were angled at the top and square at the bottom. In the Ming dynasty, Mandarins of the fourth rank or above used ivory , while those of the fifth rank or below used wooden ones.

The  fell out of use in the Imperial Court system during the Qing dynasty.

Use in Japan
The character's unusual pronunciation seems to derive from the fact the baton is approximately one  (an old unit of measurement equivalent to ) in length.

The emperor's  is roughly square at both ends, whereas a retainer's is rounded at the top and square at the bottom. Both become progressively narrow towards the bottom.

The  originally had a strip of paper attached to the back containing instructions and memoranda for the ceremony or event about to take place, but it later evolved into a purely ceremonial implement meant to add solemnity to rituals. According to the Taihō Code, a set of administrative laws implemented in the year 701, nobles of the fifth rank and above had to use an ivory , while those below that rank were to use oak, Japanese yew, holly, cherry, sakaki, Japanese cedar, or other woods. Ivory, however, was too hard to obtain, and the law was changed. The Japanese  is usually made of woods like Japanese yew, holly, cherry, or Japanese cedar. The  is often seen in portraits of the Japanese , emperors, nobleman, and Shinto priests.

Gallery

See also
 
 
 
 Ruyi (scepter)

References

Ceremonial objects
Chinese traditional clothing
Chinese words and phrases
Confucian culture
East Asian traditions
Japanese religious terminology
Korean clothing
Regalia
Religious objects
Shinto in Japan
Shinto religious objects
Shinto religious clothing
Taoist culture
Vietnamese clothing
Wands
Writing media